Bill Berg is an American jazz and fusion drummer known for his work with the group Flim & the BB's, as well as with guitarist Wayne Johnson.

Early life 
Berg is a native of Hibbing, Minnesota.

Career 
Berg worked as the drummer on the Bob Dylan album Blood on the Tracks. Berg has also worked with Leo Kottke, Gary Brunotte, Bill Perkins, and others. He has also worked with the Marc Yaxley Trio, a local jazz band in Transylvania County, North Carolina.

Personal life 
Berg lives in Brevard, North Carolina, and frequently performs in the Asheville metropolitan area.

References

External links
 
Billboard magazine article on "Blood On The Tracks" reunion concert, 2004 

American jazz drummers
Living people
Year of birth missing (living people)
Flim & the BB's members
People from Hibbing, Minnesota
Musicians from Minnesota
People from Transylvania County, North Carolina
People from Brevard, North Carolina